The 1992 United States Senate election in Washington was held on November 3, 1992. Incumbent Democratic Senator Brock Adams chose not to run for re-election to a second term after eight different women made allegations that he had engaged in various acts of sexual misconduct, including harassment and rape. Adams denied the allegations, but his popularity statewide was weakened considerably by them, and he chose to retire rather than risk costing the party his seat. 

State Senator Patty Murray defeated Republican U.S. Representative Rod Chandler in the race to succeed Adams. Chandler seemed to have the upper hand in one of the debates until, for some unknown reason, he quoted the Roger Miller song "Dang Me." He was further damaged by the unpopularity of President George H. W. Bush in the Pacific Northwest.

Blanket primary

Candidates

Democratic
 Don Bonker, former U.S. Representative from Vancouver
 Gene Hart
 Patty Murray, State Senator from Bothell
 Jeffery Brian Venezia

Independent
 LaPriel C. Barnes

Republican
 Rod Chandler, U.S. Representative from Bellevue
 Leo K. Thorsness, former State Senator from Renton
 Tim Hill, King County Executive

Socialist Workers
 Mark Severs

Washington Taxpayers
William Cassius Goodloe, former Chief Justice of the Washington Supreme Court

Results

General election

Results

See also
 1992 United States Senate elections

References

Washington
1992
1992 Washington (state) elections